China Changfeng Mechanics and Electronics Technology Academy (中国长峰机电技术研究设计院) or China Changfeng, founded in 1957, is one of the four design academies under the China Aerospace Science and Technology Corporation (CASC). It is located on Yongding Road, in the western suburbs of Beijing, and employs more than 16,000 personnel.

Changfeng conducts research, development and production of air and missile defense, ASAT, and associated radar systems. It is also responsible for several SAM systems, including the HQ-2, HQ-7, and HQ-61. Changfeng developed the 8610 SRBM based on the HQ-2 SAM, previously developed by the academy. In recent years, Changfeng has expanded its focus to include submarine-launched and land-based ballistic missiles, such as the JL-1, DF-1 and DF-21.

Other names
Other names for Changfeng are : Second Academy, Surface-to-Air Missile (SAM) Academy, China Changfeng Group (CCFG), China Changfeng Company (CCC), China Changfeng (CCF), China Chang Feng Mechano-Electronic Engineering Company.

Sources
 NTI, China Changfeng Mechanics and Electronics Technology Academy

References

Space program of the People's Republic of China
Aerospace companies of China